The 1995 Britannic Assurance County Championship was the 96th officially organised running of the County Championship. Warwickshire won the Championship title for the second successive year.

Table
16 points for a win
8 points to each side for a tie
8 points to side still batting in a match in which scores finish level
Bonus points awarded in first 120 overs of first innings
Batting: 200 runs - 1 point, 250 runs - 2 points 300 runs - 3 points, 350 runs - 4 points
Bowling: 3-4 wickets - 1 point, 5-6 wickets - 2 points 7-8 wickets - 3 points, 9-10 wickets - 4 points
No bonus points awarded in a match starting with less than 8 hours' play remaining. A one-innings match is played, with the winner gaining 12 points.
Position determined by points gained. If equal, then decided on most wins.

References

1995 in English cricket
County Championship seasons